423 - Chattanooga, Johnson City, Kingsport, Bristol: Initially split from 615 in 1995.
 615 and 629 (overlay) - Greater Nashville, including Murfreesboro:  615 initially split from 901 in a 1954 flash-cut.  The 629 overlay for the entire area code was made effective in 2015
 731 - Jackson, Dyersburg, Union City :  Initially split from 901 in 2001.
 865 - Knoxville:  Initially split from 423 in 1999.
 901 - Memphis: An original NANPA area code, initially covering the entire state in 1947.
 931 - Clarksville, Columbia, Manchester, Cookeville:  Initially split from 615 in 1997.

 
Tennessee
Area codes